γ Hydri, Latinised as Gamma Hydri, is a solitary, red-hued star in the constellation Hydrus. It has an apparent visual magnitude of 3.26, making it easily visible to the naked eye at night. Based upon an annual parallax shift of 15.24 mas as measured from Earth, the system is located about 214 light-years from the Sun.

This is an evolved red giant star with a stellar classification of M1 III, and is most likely on the asymptotic giant branch of the HR diagram. It is a semiregular variable that pulsates between magnitudes 3.26 and 3.33, although its period is not known precisely. It has about the same mass as the Sun, but has expanded to around 62 times the Sun's radius.

References

M-type giants
Semiregular variable stars
Hydrus (constellation)
Hydri, Gamma
Durchmusterung objects
024512
017678
1208